Adinath Kothare (born 13 May 1984) is an Indian actor, producer, and director, who predominantly works in Marathi films. His directorial debut film, 'Paani,' won the 'National Film Award for Best Film on Environment Conservation/Preservation' at the 66th National Film Awards and also won him the 'Best Actor' award at the New York Indian Film Festival. His father, Mahesh Kothare, is a veteran film director of Marathi films.

Kothare made his acting debut as a child actor in the 1994 hit film 'Majha Chakula'. For it, he received 'Best Child Actor' at the Maharashtra State Film Awards. Kothare's next movie 'Ved Lagi Jeeva' was directed by his father, Mahesh Kothare, in the year 2010. This role earned him a nomination in the 'Best Actor' category at 'Zee Gaurav Puraskar'.

Other films include 'Zapatlela 2' (2013) and 'Avatarachi Goshta' (2014). Avatarachi Goshta won many awards at the 51st Maharashtra State Marathi Film Award, Zee Gaurav Puraskar (2014), and Sahyadri Cine Film Awards 2014.

As a film producer, Adinath Kothare produced the movie 'Zapatlela 2' (2013) the 1st ever Marathi True 3D film which also saw him in the lead role in the film.

Personal life
Kothare was born on 13 May 1984. Kothare's father, Mahesh Kothare, is one of the most famous filmmakers in the Marathi film industry. Mahesh Kothare has directed and produced many Marathi films and has also produced a few Hindi films. Kothare's grandfather, Amber Kothare, did negative and supporting roles in films directed by his father such as De Danadan (1987) and Dhadakebaaz (1990).

In 2011, Kothare married Marathi film and television actress Urmilla Kothare. The couple has a daughter named Jiza Kothare.

Media image

Career
In 1994, Kothare first appeared in the movie Majha Chakula, Adinath's next movie Ved Lagi Jeeva was directed by his father Mahesh Kothare in the year 2010. After that, he appeared in Aditya Sarpotdar's musical drama film Satrangi Re playing Rego (Goraksha Mhapusekar), which was released on 3 February 2012, also starring Amruta Khanvilkar, Siddharth Chandekar, Pooja Sawant, Bhushan Pradhan, Soumil Shringarpure, Uday Tikekar, Vidyadhar Joshi, Supriya Matkari and Madhav Abhyankar.

Adinath also acted in his father's ambitious project, the first Marathi true 3D film Zapatlela 2, which was released on 7 June 2014. The film is the sequel to the 1993 Marathi film Zapatlela. In 2014, he played the lead role in Hello Nandan along with Mrunal Thakur and then starred in the film Anvatt alongside his wife Urmilla Kothare. Kothare next starred in Ishq Wala Love along with Sulagna Panigrahi, which released on 10 October 2014.

His next film, released on 26 December 2014, Avatarachi Goshta won many awards at the 51st Maharashtra State Marathi Film Festival 2014, Zee Gaurav 2014 Film Awards, and Sahyadri Cine Film Awards 2014. Kothare produced Zapatlela 2 under his own production company Kothare Vision Private Ltd. He did television debut with Zee Marathi's 100 Days serial. He did directorial debut with the Marathi film Paani.

In 2021, He played former Indian cricketer Dilip Vengsarkar in 83 film, a sports drama film based on the 1983 Cricket World Cup. In 2022, He played the role of Daulatrao Deshmane in the Marathi film Chandramukhi.

Filmography

Films

Television

Awards and nominations

See also
 List of Marathi film actors

References

External links 

 
 

Indian male film actors
Male actors in Marathi cinema
Living people
1984 births
Male actors from Mumbai
Indian male soap opera actors
Male actors in Marathi television